Asynapteron is a genus of beetles in the family Cerambycidae, containing the following species:

 Asynapteron contrarium Martins, 1971
 Asynapteron eburnigerum (Aurivillius, 1899)
 Asynapteron equatorianum (Martins, 1960)
 Asynapteron glabriolum (Bates, 1872)
 Asynapteron inca (Martins, 1962)
 Asynapteron ranthum Martins, 1970

References

Ibidionini